Tymmophorus is a genus of parasitoid wasps belonging to the family Ichneumonidae.

The species of this genus are found in Europe and Northern America.

Species:
 Tymmophorus erythrozonus (Forster, 1850)
 Tymmophorus fasciventris Dasch, 1964

References

Ichneumonidae
Ichneumonidae genera